Jiangsu Jiangyan High School, also known as Jiangyan High or Jiangzhong, is a high school located at Jiangyan City, Taizhou Prefecture, Jiangsu. The school was founded by Gao Hama in 1939.  In 1980, it was named a Key Middle School by the government of Jiangsu province. In 1996 it was designated as a Provincial Run School and it passed the National Model School Qualification in 1999.

Description
In the 1950s Jiangyan Middle School became a public school. The scale of the school expanded, and when the number of students increased, the school facilities became deficient. New classrooms and offices were built, and a new auditorium at the same time. In 1952, on the former site of the South Day Temple, the school built the auditorium, named the May Fourth Movement Hall. The auditorium is heavily used as a meeting room, a restaurant for students, a factory workshop, and a dorm room. There are three interconnected buildings in the school, one for each grade. There is  a reading room in which students can read books, do homework, or discuss problems. The main administration building has a Roman style.

Staff
The school has more than 260 teaching and administrative staff. Cooperation with a high school in Australia in 1999 led to several teacher exchanges between the schools. Since the reform and opening up of China, Jiangyan Middle School has attracted many young students from beyond Jiangsu province. Many students have achieved good scores in the national college entrance exam. The Jianyan Computer Science Olympia team placed first in the Jiangsu tournament, and over 30 students have won provincial or higher awards. The secretary general of the school was named to the National Advanced Party Branch.

Awards
In 2007 Jiangyan Middle School  became one of the first five-star high schools in Jiangsu province; it is the only five-star high school in Taizhou. The students consistently excel in the university entrance exams and win  provincial prizes each year. Recently three students have won gold prizes and one student won the international gold prize. Each year, approximately ten students are admitted Tsinghua University and Beijing University.

Previous presidents
 Qian Yiwu
 Lian Wanneng
 Liu Chongxun
 Xu Xinxiang

References

External links
 
 
 

Educational institutions established in 1939
High schools in Jiangsu
Taizhou, Jiangsu
1939 establishments in China